Reiner Eberhard Moritz (born 1938 in Hanover) is a German film director and film producer.

Biography 
Moritz studied musicology, German and Romance studies. He graduated from the Ludwig Maximilian University of Munich in 1970. In 1977, he founded the RM Creative Fernseh- und Film-GmbH in Munich, which still exists today. In 1978 he founded the RM Arts Fernseh- und Film GmbH, which later passed to the Kirch Group and since 2005 has rights to some 900 productions owned by the Arthaus Musik label. RM Arts produced a large number of documentaries in the field of music and visual arts.

In 1981, RM Arts started the series 1000 Meisterwerke for the WDR under the direction of Moritz. Moritz knew Dmitri Shostakovich and produced the documentary Ein Mann mit vielen Gesichtern ("A man with many faces") about him.

Honours 
 2007: Honorary Preis der deutschen Schallplattenkritik.
 2009: Knight's Cross 1st Class of the Order of the Lion of Finland.

Filmography (selection)

As director 
 1981: 1000 Meisterwerke (series)
 1991: Werner Tübke. About the adventure of figuration
 2004: L'heure espagnole
 2006: The Real Rameau
 2014: Tanz macht Fernsehgeschichte

As producer 
 1972: Pink Floyd: Live at Pompeii
 1978: Monsieur René Magritte
 1984: Puccini
 1992: Das Doppelleben des Arnold Bax ("The Double Life of Arnold Bax")
 1998: In Rehearsal: Christoph von Dohnányi with the Philharmonia Orchestra

References

External links 
 
 
 
 RM Arts on IMDb

German documentary film directors
Recipients of the Order of the Lion of Finland
1938 births
Film people from Hanover
Living people